James Veres (born 1949) is an American actor and producer.

He was married to the German actress, Ursula Karven. Their 4-year-old son, Daniel Karven-Veres, drowned while attending a party at Mötley Crüe's drummer, Tommy Lee's, Malibu mansion in 2001. Karven and Veres sued Lee for $10 million, however a jury found Lee not guilty.

Producer 

 1994–1996: Hart to Hart
 2000: Green Sails (executive producer)
 2005: Reefer Madness: The Movie Musical (executive producer)
2009: ZOS: Zone of Separation

Actor 

 1977: A Killing Affair
 1978: Ziegfeld: The Man and His Women
 1978: To Kill a Cop
 1978: Wonder Woman
 1978: Fantasy Island 
 1979: Some Kind of Miracle
 1982: Desire, the Vampire

References

External links

1949 births
Living people
Place of birth missing (living people)
American male television actors
American film producers